Charles Mayer (7 January 1882 – 5 May 1972) was an American middleweight and heavyweight boxer who competed in the early twentieth century.

He won two medals in boxing at the 1904 Summer Olympics, one of only five boxers in Olympic history to ever do so. In the middleweight category he defeated fellow American Benjamin Spradley in the final to win a gold medal but took silver in the heavier heavyweight category. Mayer only had to compete in two fights to capture his two medals, in the middleweight class only two boxers participated. In the heavyweight class there were three boxers with Mayer earning the bye in the first round.

Mayer was the National Amateur Middleweight Champion in 1905.

1904 Olympic results
Middleweight
Final: Defeated Benjamin Spradley (United States) TKO 3

Heavyweight
Semifinal: bye
Final: Lost to Sam Berger on points

References

External links

1882 births
1972 deaths
Middleweight boxers
Heavyweight boxers
Olympic boxers of the United States
Boxers at the 1904 Summer Olympics
Olympic gold medalists for the United States in boxing
Olympic silver medalists for the United States in boxing
Place of birth missing
American male boxers
Medalists at the 1904 Summer Olympics